The Hann function is named after the Austrian meteorologist Julius von Hann.  It is a window function used to perform Hann smoothing. The function, with length  and amplitude  is given by:
   

For digital signal processing, the function is sampled symmetrically (with spacing  and amplitude ):

which is a sequence of  samples, and  can be even or odd.  (see )  It is also known as the raised cosine window, Hann filter, von Hann window, etc.

Fourier transform 

Discrete transforms 

The Discrete-time Fourier transform (DTFT) of the  length, time-shifted sequence is defined by a Fourier series, which also has a 3-term equivalent that is derived similarly to the Fourier transform derivation:

The truncated sequence  is a DFT-even (aka periodic) Hann window.  Since the truncated sample has value zero, it is clear from the Fourier series definition that the DTFTs are equivalent.  However, the approach followed above results in a significantly different-looking, but equivalent, 3-term expression:

An N-length DFT of the window function samples the DTFT at frequencies  for integer values of   From the expression immediately above, it is easy to see that only 3 of the N DFT coefficients are non-zero.  And from the other expression, it is apparent that all are real-valued.  These properties are appealing for real-time applications that require both windowed and non-windowed (rectangularly windowed) transforms, because the windowed transforms can be efficiently derived from the non-windowed transforms by convolution.

Name 

The function is named in honor of von Hann, who used the three-term weighted average smoothing technique on meteorological data.  However, the term Hanning function is also conventionally used, derived from the paper in which the term hanning a signal was used to mean applying the Hann window to it.   The confusion arose from the similar Hamming function, named after Richard Hamming.

See also
 Window function
 Apodization
 Raised cosine distribution
 Raised-cosine filter

Page citations

References

External links 
 Hann function at MathWorld

Signal processing